St. Luke's Episcopal Church, was located at Findlay & Baymiller Streets, in the Old West End Neighborhood of Cincinnati, Ohio. The church was founded in 1883. Rev. Lewis Brown served St. Luke's since 1883. Rev. Ewald Haun, was Rector in 1911. In 1890, the parish had nearly 300 communicants. This was a member parish of the Episcopal Diocese of Southern Ohio.

Located just outside the Dayton Street Historic District, upon closing the church was merged with another parish in the Avondale neighborhood of Cincinnati. The name was then taken by the former Church of the Resurrection in the neighborhood of Sayler Park.

External links
St. Luke's circa 1911
St. Luke Episcopal Church Sayler Park, Ohio

Episcopal churches in Ohio
Episcopal churches in Cincinnati
Religious organizations established in 1883